Rene Van Verseveld (born 29 June 1959) is a Dutch musician, songwriter, recording engineer, composer and record producer. He lives in Santa Clarita and works in his own studio, Future Sound Studios, in Hollywood, California.

Early years 
Rene Van Verseveld, son of Dutch jazz musician Cees Van Verseveld, began playing music at age 9. A classically trained bassist, he toured the world playing on cruise ships before collaborating with King MC in Amsterdam on the 1986 European hit "What Have I Done for You Lately".

Top 40 European hits between 1986 and 1992 

Rene Van Verseveld established himself as a European dance record producer working with such artists as Candy Dulfer and 2 Unlimited, charting in the Dutch, French, Scandinavian, German and British Top 40 Dance and Pop Charts 9 times between the years of 1986 and 1992 with the songs:
 Gerard Joling - "Can't Take My Eyes Off Of You"
 Tatjana Simic ft. Wendy Alane Wright - "Feel Good"
 Def La Desh ft. Wendy Alane Wright - "Feel The Rhythm"
 Zype - "Used To Be Your Lover"
 Room 4 2 - "Over You"
 Room 4 2 - "Baby He's Mine"
 Miker G - "Show'm The Bass"
 T-Minus 5 - "Unforgiven" ft. Wendy Alane Wright
 King MC - "What Have I Done For You Lately"

Engineering and production career 
Rene Van Verseveld moved to Los Angeles, California in 1994, where he formed Future Sound Studios. He partnered up with Fernando Garibay and together, they have worked with many artists, such as:
 Sonu Nigam
 Han Geng
 Dr. Dre
 Kumbia Kings
 Los Super Reyes
 Mark Wahlberg
 Ricky Martin
 Lady Gaga
 Mark Anthony
 Paris Hilton
 Macy Gray
 Little Richard
 Grace Jones
 Garbage
 Jay-Z
 Enrique Iglesias
 Will Smith
 Technotronic
 Ike Turner        (Risin' with the Blues - 2007 Grammy Winning Album, Traditional Blues category)
 Smokey Robinson
 Kevin Hart (Real Husbands of Hollywood)
 Kelly Rowland
 Bobby Brown
Are among many who visited and recorded at his studio.

Film and television scores 

Rene Van Verseveld has worked as composer and/or engineer on the scores of numerous television programs and films including:
Pancharangi (film) - 2010
Dress My Nest - Style Network (television series) - 2008
Most Shocking Unsolved Crimes (television series) - 2008
Sunset Tan Reality (reality show) - 2008
Destination Truth (television series) - 2008
Celebrity Exposed (television series) - 2008
Access Hollywood (entertainment news program) - 2008
History Channel  -2008
90210 (television series) - 2008
Everybody Hates Chris (television series) - 2007
American Pie Presents: Beta House (film) - soundtrack - "Techno" 2007
Burn Notice (television series) - 2007 and 2008
Just Jordan (television series) - 2007
X's & O's (film) - 2007
The King of Queens (television series) - 1999 to 2007
Lincoln Heights (television series) - 2006
Invincible (film) - 2006
Lost (television series) - 2006
Soul Food (television series) - 2004
CSI: Miami (television series) - 2004
American Pie (film) - 2001
Big Brother (television series) - 2000 and 2001
The Parkers (television series) - 1999
Butter (film) - 1998
 Real Husbands Of Hollywood (2014 BET reality show)

References

2. "Real Husbands of Hollywood" (BET Reality Show)

External links
Rene Van Verseveld Official MySpace Page
Rene van Verseveld at Discogs
Rene van Verseveld at Artistdirect

Living people
Dutch record producers
Dutch jazz double-bassists
Musicians from Utrecht (city)
1959 births
People from Santa Clarita, California
21st-century double-bassists